Ruben Ochoa is an artist who lives and works in Mexico City, Mexico.  Ochoa's work is mainly large scale photographic, and uses adapted nineteenth-century techniques to develop onto materials such as wood and stone.  The subject matter of his work varies greatly, from studies in architectural detail and vintage objects to epic representations of contemporary social and religious morality, and he employs a variety of media including photography, installations, artist books, adapted objects and spatial interventions.  He is entirely self-taught, and his rise to international recognition has been rapid and recent.

Major projects 

His work includes the series "Bestiary (or the New Deadly Sins)", a large scale series of seven photographs using adapted nineteenth-century techniques to develop the artist's contemporary tableaux of the seven deadly sins onto caliza stone from Yucatán, Mexico.  The series' inaugural exhibition took place at the British-American Museum, with further exhibitions at the ex-convent of Santo Domingo, Mexico City, where the exhibition was accompanied by an installation, "Confessional", in which members of the public were invited to participate in the exhibition's meditation on sin by confessing their own on a prepared gallery wall space.  Other projects include the touring exhibition 360°,  an associative series of photographs shown in cities around Europe on a rotational basis; Piso 86, a photographic homage to fellow Mexican artist Manuel Felguérez exhibited alongside Felguérez's work at the Indianilla cultural center in Mexico City; and THERMO, a large format photographic project using a thermal camera, exhibited at the World Water Forum in 2006.  Ochoa's work has been exhibited in Europe, North America and Latin America, with notable exhibitions in Barcelona, New York, Stuttgart, London, Vienna and Copenhagen.  In Mexico he has exhibited at the National Anthropological Museum, the Torre Mayor, the Franz Mayer Museum, the National Auditorium, San Angel Cultural Center and the National Center of the Arts and other smaller galleries.   His work is held in several public and private collections.

Commissions, prizes and other projects 

Ruben Ochoa has won various international photographic contests such as "Nopal Urbano", organized by the Mexico City Government, and the 12th Mercosur International Salon in  Buenos Aires, Argentina, at which he took first place honours.  In 2007 the Lux Art Institute of San Diego, California, commissioned a piece for its private collection, for which Ochoa produced the REAL IMAGE project.  His work was commissioned for exhibitions of "20 Iberoamerican artists", and he represented Mexico in the PhotoIreland Festival in 2010.   Other commissions include the curation of "Dialogo de Bancas" exhibition at Indianilla cultural center in Mexico City and a study of the work of Leonora Carrington.  Mexican sculptor Javier Marín invited him to participate in his catalogue book for his Casa de America's exhibition in Madrid, Spain, in 2007.  He has collaborated with Mexican artists Marín, Vicente Rojo Almazán, Manuel Felguérez, José Luis Cuevas, Gabriel Macotela and Francisco Toledo.  Ochoa completed an artistic residency at CACiS in Barcelona, Spain, in 2011 where he produced a sculpture installation at Calders, Spain, and the Almohada project, a series of photographs developed on stone and installed at the Centre d'Art Contemporani i Sostenibilitat El Forn de la Calç, a series of disused stone ovens converted into an exhibition space.   He has lectured widely in Mexico and been invited to the juries of national artistic and photographic contests.  Ochoa's work has been featured in the Saatchi Online "New Photography" and "Black and White" collections, curated by the Director of the Saatchi Gallery, London.

Books and publications 

Ochoa's publications include a project for Art on Paper magazine, "Diaries of a Young Artist", published as a book in 2009, and a commissioned piece for Monocle magazine.  A special edition of Artes de México on the subject of climate change featured Ochoa's THERMO project.  His artist book, "Hoy Como Nunca", is a limited edition photographic homage to Mexican novelist José Emilio Pacheco's novel, "Las batallas en el desierto" and was exhibited at the CODEX 2013 International Book Fair.  He has designed a range of album artwork, for tango musician César Olguin among others. Testamenti, a collection of photographs of acute architectural detail around Europe, was published in 2013.

References

External links
Official website
Bestiary (or the new deadly sins)
Video introduction to "Bestiary" and accompanying "Confessional" (in English)
Video "You Get What You Deserve" to accompany the "Bestiary" exhibition
The Walking Salvation Tool project at SONS Museum, Belgium
The Land of the Sun project for Museo Memoria y Tolerancia, Mexico City
"Puntos Suspensivos" collaboration with Vicente Rojo
Video of Ochoa's conference at the Polyforum Cultural Siqueiros
Video "Adios Nonino" projected at the CENART in Mexico City
Ruben Ochoa's artistic residence at CACiS, Barcelona 
Indianilla cultural center, Mexico City
Milenio review of "Hoy Como Nunca" artist book

Living people
Mexican photographers
Artists from Mexico City
Year of birth missing (living people)